Primrose Path is the debut full-length album by Welsh post-hardcore band Dream State, released on 18 October 2019 through UNFD. It was produced by Dan Weller and opened at number 100 on the UK Albums Chart.

Singles
On 6 March 2019, the first single from the album "Hand in Hand" was released. The second single, "Primrose", was released on 10 July 2019. This was followed by the third single "Open Windows" and an official announcement of the album on 20 August 2019. On 8 October 2019, just ten days before the release of the album, a fourth single "Twenty Letters" was released on BBC Radio 1.

A fifth and last single and music video from the album was released on 21 June 2020 for the song "Are You Ready to Live?".

Track listing

Personnel
Dream State
Charlotte-Jayne "CJ" Gilpin – lead vocals
Aled Evans – guitar, bass
Rhys Wilcox – guitar, bass, backing vocals
Jamie Lee – drums

Production
Dan Weller – producer

Charts

References

2019 debut albums
UNFD albums